Park Township may refer to:

 Park Township, Sedgwick County, Kansas
 Park Township, Ottawa County, Michigan
 Park Township, St. Joseph County, Michigan
 Park Township, Pine County, Minnesota
 Park Township, Pembina County, North Dakota, in Pembina County, North Dakota
 Park Township, Hand County, South Dakota, in Hand County, South Dakota

Township name disambiguation pages